Aberaman is an electoral ward in Rhondda Cynon Taf, Wales. It was an electoral ward for much of the twentieth century, for the purposes of electing members to Glamorgan County Council and the Aberdare Urban District Council. The village of Aberaman was subsequently covered by two electoral wards, Aberaman North and Aberaman South, for the purposes of electing members to the Rhondda Cynon Taf County Borough Council. Aberaman North was composed mainly of Aberaman itself while Aberaman South included Abercwmboi, Cwmaman, Godreaman and Glynhafod.

Aberaman first became an electoral ward in the late nineteenth century with the formation of Glamorgan County Council. Aberaman was also one of the five electoral wards of the Aberdare Urban District Council from its formation in 1894. The other wards were Aberdare Town, Blaengwawr, Gadlys and Llwydcoed.

History 1889-1914
Representation of the ward in the 1890s was dominated by supporters of the Liberal Party although elections were often not fought on political lines and the local influence and standing of individual candidates was an important factor.  This enabled Edmund Mills Hann, a prominent figure in the Powell Duffryn company, although unsuccessful at county level in 1889, to hold a seat on the Aberdare UDC for most of this period. Significantly he continued to hold a seat at Aberaman after the Labour Party captured several of the district seats in the early years of the new century. One of the most significant contests was that in 1903 (see below) for the Aberdare UDC when William Rees, a Labour candidate and deacon, unseated Thomas Humphreys, minister of Seion, Cwmaman.

Glamorgan County Council 1889-1914
In 1889, Thomas Philip White was elected as Liberal member for Aberaman, defeating Edmund Mills Hann. This contest was widely reported and was a significant victory for a local tradesman, T.P. White, over a leading colliery official who later became a prominent figure in the South Wales and Monmouthshire Coalowners' Association. White had been chosen as Liberal candidate after a public meeting at Saron Chapel, Aberaman. In a letter to the press he referred to pressure from colliery officials and sought to re-assure the electors that there was a secret ballot.

The result of the first election was regarded with surprise in some quarters and one local newspaper predicted that would be successful in the by-election. He was, however, defeated by Thomas Davies of Abercwmboi.

Thomas Davies was re-elected in 1892. Following the elevation of T.P. White to the aldermanic bench. White had moved from Cwmaman to Maesycymmer during the intervening period and did not seek re-election.

Davies was again re-elected in 1895. He was opposed by Thomas Rees, landlord of the Swan Hotel, Aberaman and elected a member of the Aberdare Urban District Council at the inaugural 1894 election. The Merthyr Times opined that there was no necessity for a contest, and that the unsuccessful candidate had wasted his time and money. 

The results for 1898 and 1901 are unavailable but by 1904, Luther Davies, a manager at the Aberaman Colliery had taken over as the county councillor for Aberaman.

Davies was again re-elected unopposed in 1907

Despite the challenge of the Labour Party at district council level, including a significant impact at Aberaman (see below), labour did not challenge for the county seat in this period.

Aberdare Urban District Council
Aberaman was also an electoral ward of the Aberdare Urban District Council from its formation in 1894.

Thomas Rees, landlord of the Swan Inn, Aberaman and a long-standing member of the Aberdare Local Board of Health prior to the formation of the district council, had run unsuccessfully for the county council the previous year but had been defeated by the sitting member, Thomas Davies of Abercwmboi. Hr narrowly held hid seat against another Liberal candidate. 

In 1899 there was a four-cornered contest.

In 1900, Thomas Humphreys was again returned unopposed.

In 1901, E.M. Hann was opposed by a Labour candidate. 

The 1902 election saw John Bucknell re-elected.

In 1903 Thomas Humphreys was defeated, having been criticised for his lack of support for the working classes.

The creation of a second seat in 1904 saw the return of Charles Stanton alongside E.M. Hann. The vicar of Aberaman was beaten into third place.

On John Bucknell's retirement in 1905, the vicar made another attempt to win the seat but was defeated by a Labour candidate.

21st century
Until 2022 the community of Aberaman had two wards, Aberaman North and Aberaman South for the purposes of Rhondda Cynon Taf County Borough Council elections. Since 1995 it had been represented by Plaid Cymru and Labour councillors.

A 2018 review of electoral arrangements by the Local Democracy and Boundary Commission for Wales would see North and South merged to recreate a single county borough ward of Aberaman. The proposals would take effect from the 2022 council elections.

2022 election
Three Labour councillors were comfortably elected at the May 2022 elections:

Evans had formerly been a councillor for Aberaman North, while Tina Williams had been a councillor for Aberaman South.

References

Wards of Rhondda Cynon Taf